= Neurovax =

Neurovax is a vaccine designed to treat patients with multiple sclerosis. Developed by Immune Response BioPharma, Inc. it is currently in phase II clinical trials. Neurovax is designed to stimulate FOXP3+ regulatory T-cells that can then suppress the autoreactive T-cells in some patients.

== Development ==
The development program for Neurovax terminated in 2008, when the company developing this vaccine was filed for bankruptcy. All work with Neurovax is now being developed by Immune Response BioPharma, Inc. Granted U.S. Patent 8,053,197 Methods for Treating Auto-Immune Diseases and has licensed TCR FOXP3+ Technology from OHSU in December 2011.

The US FDA granted NeuroVax both FDA Pediatric Orphan Designation on February 6, 2014 & FDA Fast Track Designation for SPMS.
